Jansen's linkage is a planar leg mechanism designed by the kinetic sculptor Theo Jansen to generate a smooth walking motion. Jansen's linkage bears artistic as well as mechanical merit for its simulation of organic walking motion using a simple rotary input. These leg mechanisms have applications in mobile robotics and in gait analysis.

The central 'crank' link moves in circles as it is actuated by a rotary actuator such as an electric motor. All other links and pin joints are unactuated and move because of the motion imparted by the crank. Their positions and orientations are uniquely defined by specifying the crank angle and hence the mechanism has only one degree of freedom (1-DoF). The kinematics and dynamics of the Jansen mechanism have been exhaustively modeled using circle intersection method and bond graphs (Newton–Euler mechanics). These models can be used to rate the actuator torque and in design of the hardware and controller for such a system.

Illustrations

References

External links

 Theo Jansen's STRANDBEEST
 Theo Jansens Strandbeest-Mechanismus (German) 
 Strandbeest created with GeoGebra
 2D Shadertoy
 3D Shadertoy

Walking
Linkages (mechanical)
Walking vehicles
Robot kinematics